Asparagus simulans is a species of flowering plant in the Asparagaceae family. It is native to Madagascar. Asparagus simulans was described by English botanist John Gilbert Baker in 1875.

References

 Baker, J. Linn. Soc., Bot. 14: 609 (1875)
 The Plant List entry
 e-Monocot entry

simulans
Taxa named by John Gilbert Baker